Limnia can refer to
 Limnia, Cyprus, a village in Cyprus
 Limnia, islands disputed between Greece and Turkey
 Limnia (Pontus), a region of the medieval Empire of Trebizond, now in northern Turkey
 Limnia (fly), a genus of flies in the family Sciomyzidae